The United States is home to a wide variety of power stations. The list below outlines power stations of significance by type, or by the state in which they reside.

By type
The following pages lists the power stations in the United States by type:
 List of largest power stations in the United States

Non-renewable energy
 Coal-fired power stations
 Natural gas-fired power stations
 Nuclear power stations

Renewable energy
 Geothermal power stations
 Hydroelectric power stations
 Solar power stations
 Wind farms (onshore)
 Wind farms (offshore)

By state
The following pages lists the power stations in the United States by states:

 List of power stations in Alabama
 List of power stations in Alaska
 List of power stations in Arizona
 List of power stations in Arkansas
 List of power stations in California
 List of power stations in Colorado
 List of power stations in Connecticut
 List of power stations in Delaware
 List of power stations in Florida
 List of power stations in Georgia
 List of power stations in Hawaii
 List of power stations in Idaho
 List of power stations in Illinois
 List of power stations in Indiana
 List of power stations in Iowa
 List of power stations in Kansas
 List of power stations in Kentucky
 List of power stations in Louisiana
 List of power stations in Maine
 List of power stations in Maryland
 List of power stations in Massachusetts
 List of power stations in Michigan
 List of power stations in Minnesota
 List of power stations in Mississippi
 List of power stations in Missouri
 List of power stations in Montana
 List of power stations in Nebraska
 List of power stations in Nevada
 List of power stations in New Hampshire
 List of power stations in New Jersey
 List of power stations in New Mexico
 List of power stations in New York
 List of power stations in North Carolina
 List of power stations in North Dakota
 List of power stations in Ohio
 List of power stations in Oklahoma
 List of power stations in Oregon
 List of power stations in Pennsylvania
 List of power stations in Rhode Island
 List of power stations in South Carolina
 List of power stations in South Dakota
 List of power stations in Tennessee
 List of power stations in Texas
 List of power stations in Utah
 List of power stations in Vermont
 List of power stations in Virginia
 List of power stations in Washington
 List of power stations in West Virginia
 List of power stations in Wisconsin
 List of power stations in Wyoming

See also
List of largest power stations in the world
List of power stations in Canada
List of power stations in Mexico

Electric power in the United States